Eduard Marti (12 October 1829 – 5 November 1896) was a Swiss politician and President of the Swiss National Council (1877/1878).

External links 
 
 

Members of the National Council (Switzerland)
Presidents of the National Council (Switzerland)
1829 births
1896 deaths
People from Rapperswil-Jona